Reyghan (also Romanized as Rīghān, Rīghān, and Rīqān; also known as Barīqān, Berīqān, and Rīqān Dowrah) is a village in Dowreh Rural District, Chegeni District, Dowreh County, Lorestan Province, Iran. At the 2006 census, its population was 480, in 99 families.

References 

Towns and villages in Dowreh County